The 2018 Asian Men's U20 Volleyball Championship was the 19th edition of the Asian Men's U20 Volleyball Championship, a biennial international volleyball tournament organised by the Asian Volleyball Confederation (AVC) with Bahrain Volleyball Association (BVA). The tournament was held in Riffa, Bahrain from 21 to 28 July 2018. The top two teams of the tournament qualified for the 2019 FIVB Volleyball Men's U21 World Championship as the AVC representatives.

Players must be born on or after 1 January 1999. And they can enroll themselves maximum for twice championships.

On 14 December 2020, the AVC announced that the 2020 Asian Men's U20 Volleyball Championship which was originally the AVC qualifier for the 2021 FIVB Volleyball Men's U21 World Championship was canceled due to COVID-19 pandemic and the top two teams of the tournament qualified for the 2021 U21 World Championship as the AVC representatives.

Qualification
The 24 AVC member associations submitted their U20 men's national team to the 2018 Asian U20 Championship. But, Uzbekistan later withdrew. The 23 AVC member associations were from 5 zonal associations, including, Central Asia (7 teams), East Asia (6 teams), Oceania (2 teams), Southeast Asia (2 teams) and West Asia (6 teams).

Qualified teams
The following teams qualified for the tournament.

Pools composition
This was the first Asian U20 Championship which used the new competition format. Following the 2017 AVC Board of Administration's unanimous decision, the new format saw teams were drawn into eight pools up to the total amount of the participating teams. Each team as well as the hosts was assigned into a pool according to their final standing of the 2016 edition. As the three best ranked teams were drawn in the same pool A, the next best three contested pool B, the next best three contested pool C. But, Uzbekistan withdrew after the draw. Final standing of the 2016 edition are shown in brackets.

Venues
 Isa Sports City Hall C, Riffa, Bahrain – Pool A, B, D, E and Final round
 Isa Sports City Hall B, Riffa, Bahrain – Pool C, F, G, H and Final round

Pool standing procedure
 Number of matches won
 Match points
 Sets ratio
 Points ratio
 If the tie continues as per the point ratio between two teams, the priority will be given to the team which won the last match between them. When the tie in points ratio is between three or more teams, a new classification of these teams in the terms of points 1, 2 and 3 will be made taking into consideration only the matches in which they were opposed to each other.

Match won 3–0 or 3–1: 3 match points for the winner, 0 match points for the loser
Match won 3–2: 2 match points for the winner, 1 match point for the loser

Preliminary round
All times are Arabia Standard Time (UTC+03:00).
Originally, the third ranked team of pool D had to play against the third ranked team of pool G in the playoffs. However, due to the absence of Uzbekistan, there were only two teams in pool G, so the third ranked team of pool D went directly to the round of 16.

Pool A

|}

|}

Pool B

|}

|}

Pool C

|}

|}

Pool D

|}

|}

Pool E

|}

|}

Pool F

|}

|}

Pool G

|}

|}

Pool H

|}

|}

Final round
All times are Arabia Standard Time (UTC+03:00).

Playoffs

|}

Round of 16

|}

Quarterfinals

|}

21st–23rd semifinal

|}

17th–20th semifinals

|}

13th–16th semifinals

|}

9th–12th semifinals
24

|}

5th–8th semifinals

|}

Semifinals

|}

21st place match

|}

19th place match

|}

17th place match

|}

15th place match

|}

13th place match

|}

11th place match

|}

9th place match

|}

7th place match

|}

5th place match

|}

3rd place match

|}

Final

|}

Final standing

Awards

Most Valuable Player
 Amirhossein Esfandiar
Best Setter
 Choi Ik-je
Best Outside Spikers
 Morteza Sharifi
 Porya Yali

Best Middle Blockers
 Soranan Nuampara
 Mehran Feyz
Best Opposite Spiker
 Ali Sahib Abushanan
Best Libero
 Park Kyeong-min

See also
2018 Asian Women's U19 Volleyball Championship

References

External links
Official website
Squads

2018
Asian Men's U20 Championship
Asian Men's U20 Championship, 2018
2018 in Bahraini sport
July 2018 sports events in Asia